is a district located in Fukushima Prefecture, Japan.

As of 2003 population data but accounting for the decreases due to the formation of the city of Tamura, the district has an estimated population of 30,658 and a density of 155 persons per km2. The total area is 197.87 km2.

Towns and villages
Miharu
Ono

Mergers
On March 1, 2005, the former towns of Funehiki, Ōgoe, Takine, and Tokiwa, and the former village of Miyakoji merged, forming the city of Tamura.

Districts in Fukushima Prefecture